Duarte is a city in Los Angeles County, California, United States. As of the 2020 census, the city population was 21,727. It is bounded to the north by the San Gabriel Mountains, to the north and west by the cities of Bradbury and Monrovia, to the south by the city of Irwindale, and to the east by the cities of Irwindale and Azusa. Duarte is located on historic U.S. Route 66 which today follows Huntington Drive through the middle of the city. The town is named after Andrés Avelino Duarte, a Californio ranchero who founded the community.

History 

Around 500 B.C., a band of Shoshonean-speaking Indians established settlements in what is now the San Gabriel Valley. These Native Americans came to be called the Gabrieliño Indians (after San Gabriel, the local mission) by early Spanish explorers, but now prefer to be called the Tongva. Since the San Gabriel Valley area was home to large numbers of oak trees such as coast live oak and interior live oak, a staple of the Tongva diet was an acorn meal made by boiling acorn flour.

Spanish era
Duarte's history with Europeans dates back to 1769, when all land in California was claimed by the king of Spain. The first Europeans visited the San Gabriel Valley, including Duarte, during a 1769 expedition from San Diego to Monterey Bay commanded by Don Gaspar de Portolà. Accompanying Portolà was a Franciscan priest from Junípero Serra's order in Mexico, Juan Crespí, who served as the diarist of the expedition. Much of what is known of early California is known only from the detailed descriptions recorded by Crespi.

On September 8, 1771, the Franciscans established the Mission San Gabriel Arcangel in the San Gabriel Valley. The mission was a resting point for early California travelers and gathered most of the native Tongva into an agricultural lifestyle. Following Mexican independence in 1821, the mission lands were nationalized.

Mexican era
Duarte named his new holdings "Rancho Azusa de Duarte". The name Azusa was derived from Asuksa-gna, the name of the Tongva settlement on the Foothills of California, on the western side of the alluvial fan where the San Gabriel River exits the San Gabriel Mountains; a portion of this area forms the northeasternmost corner of Duarte. That land grant now comprises portions of Arcadia, portions of Monrovia, all of Bradbury, all of Duarte, portions of Irwindale, portions of Azusa and a portion of Baldwin Park. Corporal Duarte had the local Indians build a small hut for his family and help him plant a kitchen garden and orchards near "the Indian Springs of the Asuksas" (in what is now Fish Canyon).

Post-Conquest era
Following the American Conquest of California, the territory was given to the United States in 1848 at the end of the Mexican–American War. In 1851, Congress passed a bill that established a Board of Land Commissioners whose duty was to determine the validity of all grants of Alta California land by Spanish and Mexican authorities.

Corporal Duarte began incurring legal expenses and other debts, which he defrayed by selling portions of his Rancho. This first sale was a  parcel at the southern end of the Rancho to Michael Whistler and two unidentified colleagues. Whistler later bought out his colleagues and sold the entire parcel to Dr. Nehemiah Beardslee, who started the first school in Duarte (which now bears his surname) and laid out the first section of Duarte's water lines. Corporal Duarte divided much of the Rancho's remainder into  plots and sold them individually.  Corporal Duarte finally won a favorable ruling from the Supreme Court for his land grant case in 1878, but by then he had sold the entire Rancho.

Many of Duarte's earliest pioneer families came to Duarte in the mid-19th century for their health, the pleasant climate, and the fertile soil. English settlers, Americans from the Midwest and Deep South, Latinos who remained from the Rancho and Japanese immigrants enabled Duarte to grow into a thriving agricultural community specializing in citrus production. The first recorded avocado tree grown in California was planted in Duarte by William Chappelow, Sr. grown from one of four seeds sent to him by the Division of Pomology of the United States Department of Agriculture in 1893.

Modern era
Two medical institutions were started in Duarte in the early part of the 20th century. This later evolved into the world-renowned City of Hope National Medical Center, a recognized leader in fighting cancer and other catastrophic diseases. In 1930, a group of Carmelite nuns known as the Carmelite Sisters of the Most Sacred Heart of Los Angeles established what is now the Santa Teresita Rest Home, known until recently as Santa Teresita Medical Center. After decades as a full-service hospital, Santa Teresita was downgraded to "medical center" in the early 21st century, after financial problems, caused both by administrative missteps as well as the costs of providing medical coverage to the uninsured, forced the hospital to close its emergency room. Santa Teresita now operates as an "outpatient services only" facility.

In 1957, a dedicated group of community members, fearing annexation by neighboring cities, led a fight for incorporation.  Indeed, parts of the original Rancho had already been annexed by neighboring Monrovia, Azusa, Irwindale, and Baldwin Park. At the same time, a rival group representing an affluent enclave in the foothills started a competing drive for incorporation, and broke off to form the separate City of Bradbury. A 2001 Los Angeles Times article stated that their petition for incorporation arrived in Sacramento on August 22, 1957, "mere moments" before the petition that would have included them in the City of Duarte. Still, many ties between the two communities remain in that they both form the Duarte Unified School District; they both share the same post office and the 91008 ZIP code; and they both share combined public services such as the Los Angeles County Sheriff's Department and Los Angeles County Fire Department, and garbage pickup (provided by Burrtec Waste Services).

The original city logo was created by Bill Botts Sr. in 1957. It consisted of a double-circular seal, with the inner circle containing an adobe arch featuring the Rancho Azusa de Duarte "d" brand (inside the arch is the original date of the Rancho's establishment, 1841) while the outer circle features the year of Duarte's incorporation (1957). The current city logo was created in early 1982 to mark Duarte's 25th anniversary of cityhood.

Like many of its neighbors, modern Duarte is a bedroom community.  The City of Duarte is geographically isolated from population centers to the east and south due to the San Gabriel River and rock quarry operations in Irwindale and Azusa. These factors have proven to be an ongoing economic challenge for local businesses as the city attracts little outside spending, and most residents spend their money elsewhere. Due to air quality and noise concerns, the City of Duarte has sought repeatedly to halt the expansion of neighboring quarry operations, but has had no success against the monied interests behind the quarries and the neighboring city governments beholden to them.  Still, over the past few decades, the city leadership has succeeded in bringing retail development to the western portion of Duarte.

In September 2010, Forbes magazine placed the ZIP code of 91008 at #1 on its annual list of America's most expensive ZIP codes, containing the parts of Duarte immediately north of neighboring Bradbury.

Geography 

Demographics

2020 
The 2020 United States Census reported that Duarte had a population of 21,727. The racial makeup of Duarte was 57.8% White (24.7% Non-Hispanic White), 6.1% African American, 1.3% Native American, 17.2% Asian, 0.1% Pacific Islander, and 6.4% from two or more races. Hispanic or Latino of any race were 49.9% of the population.

The Census reported that 63.1% of the population lived in owner-occupied housing.

There were 7,132 households, with an average household size of 2.98.

The population was 4.5% persons under 5 years old,  17.6% between the ages of 6 and 17, 58.5% ages 18 to 65, and 19.4% 65 years of age or older.  The population of Duarte was 54.8% female.

According to the 2020 United States Census, Duarte had a median household income of $75,083, with 10.2% of the population living below the federal poverty line.

2010 
The 2010 United States Census reported that Duarte had a population of 21,321. The racial makeup of Duarte was 11,076 (51.9%) White (26.9% Non-Hispanic White), 1,587 (7.4%) African American, 179 (0.8%) Native American, 3,361 (15.8%) Asian, 26 (0.1%) Pacific Islander, 4,108 (19.3%) from other races, and 984 (4.6%) from two or more races. Hispanic or Latino of any race were 10,190 persons (47.8%).

The Census reported that 20,914 people (98.1% of the population) lived in households, 19 (0.1%) lived in non-institutionalized group quarters, and 388 (1.8%) were institutionalized.

There were 7,013 households, out of which 2,458 (35.0%) had children under the age of 18 living in them, 3,597 (51.3%) were opposite-sex married couples living together, 1,004 (14.3%) had a female householder with no husband present, 363 (5.2%) had a male householder with no wife present.  There were 285 (4.1%) unmarried opposite-sex partnerships, and 66 (0.9%) same-sex married couples or partnerships. 1,666 households (23.8%) were made up of individuals, and 888 (12.7%) had someone living alone who was 65 years of age or older. The average household size was 2.98.  There were 4,964 families (70.8% of all households); the average family size was 3.54.

The population was spread out, with 4,737 people (22.2%) under the age of 18, 1,863 people (8.7%) aged 18 to 24, 5,567 people (26.1%) aged 25 to 44, 5,776 people (27.1%) aged 45 to 64, and 3,378 people (15.8%) who were 65 years of age or older.  The median age was 39.9 years. For every 100 females, there were 89.6 males.  For every 100 females age 18 and over, there were 85.8 males.

The homeowner vacancy rate was 1.1%; the rental vacancy rate was 4.4%.  14,796 people (69.4% of the population) lived in owner-occupied housing units and 6,118 people (28.7%) lived in rental housing units.

According to the 2010 United States Census, Duarte had a median household income of $62,250, with 13.4% of the population living below the federal poverty line.

2000 
As of the census of 2000, there were 21,486 people, 6,635 households, and 4,889 families residing in the city. The population density was 3,215.7 inhabitants per square mile (1,241.9/km2). The racial makeup of the city was 52.02% White, 9.08% Black or African American, 0.94% Native American, 12.62% Asian, 0.11% Pacific Islander, 19.99% from other races, and 5.23% from two or more races, while 43.41% of the population were Hispanic or Latino of any race.

There were 6,635 households, out of which 38.9% had children under the age of 18 living with them, 54.8% were married couples living together, 13.6% had a female householder with no husband present, and 26.3% were non-families. 21.5% of all households were made up of individuals, and 9.4% had someone living alone who was 65 years of age or older.  The average household size was 3.16 and the average family size was 3.70.

In the city, the population was spread out, with 28.2% under the age of 18, 8.5% from 18 to 24, 29.6% from 25 to 44, 21.8% from 45 to 64, and 11.9% who were 65 years of age or older.  The median age was 34 years.  For every 100 females, there were 90.9 males.  For every 100 females age 18 and over, there were 85.8 males.

The median income for a household in the city was $50,744, and the median income for a family was $56,556. Males had a median income of $39,812 versus $33,045 for females. The per capita income for the city was $19,648.  11.3% of the population and 8.4% of families were below the poverty line.  Out of the total population, 13.3% of those under the age of 18 and 10.6% of those 65 and older were living below the poverty line.

Government and infrastructure 

Duarte has a council-manager government with a city council whose seven members are directly elected by residents. The current mayor is Bryan Urias.

The Los Angeles County Department of Health Services operates the Monrovia Health Center in Monrovia, serving Duarte.

Education 
The Duarte Unified School District serves students from Duarte, Bradbury, and unincorporated communities to the south of Duarte and Monrovia. The district contains four elementary schools (Maxwell, Beardslee, Royal Oaks, and Valley View), one high school (Duarte High School) and one continuation high school (Mt. Olive Continuation High School, since renamed to the "Mt. Olive Institute of Technology" as of June 2013), CS Arts (California School of Arts) as of 2018.

Within Duarte, there are also five licensed private schools. Foothill Oaks Academy is a non-sectarian school serving students from preschool through 8th grade. The Duarte Montessori School is affiliated with the American Montessori Society and serves students from preschool through 2nd grade.  The School of the Little Scholar is a non-sectarian preschool. ABC School is another non-sectarian preschool that focuses on children with special education needs. The Hayden Child Care Center is a Roman Catholic-affiliated school serving students in preschool and kindergarten.

Places of worship

Christian

Baptist 
 First Baptist Church of Duarte
 Grace Fellowship
 Berean Bible Baptist Church
 New Jerusalem Missionary Baptist Church

Church of Jesus Christ of Latter-day Saints 
 Duarte 1st and 2nd ward

Evangelical 
 Christian Alliance Bible Church (Chinese Evangelical)
 Covenant Life Ministries

Methodist 
 Church of The Foothills: United Methodist Church of Duarte

Pentecostal 
 New Life Assembly of God
 New Hope Church of God in Christ

Roman Catholic 
 St. Joseph's Chapel of Santa Teresita Medical Center which offers Mass in both the pre-Vatican II and the post-Vatican II form
 Carmelite Healthcare Apostolate convent (branch convent of Discalced Carmelites - not open to the public)

Most Catholic residents attend mass at Immaculate Conception Church just outside city limits in Monrovia, which serves Monrovia, Duarte and Bradbury.

Other non-denominational 
 Duarte Christian Church
 Joy Christian Center
 Church of Christ (independent)

Islamic 
 Masjid Qurtubah

Public safety 
The Los Angeles County Sheriff's Department (LASD) operates the Temple Station in Temple City, serving not only Duarte, but also neighboring Bradbury, while fire protection services are provided by the Los Angeles County Fire Department through Station 44 (paramedic services are provided by nearby Stations 29 in Baldwin Park and 32 in Azusa).

Duarte also has its own in-house "Department of Public Safety", where its officers (separate from the LASD) are assigned mainly with issuing citations for various violation of the city's Municipal Code, as well as issuance of dog licenses and bicycle permits.

Media
Duarte community news are provided by the San Gabriel Valley Tribune and Duarte Dispatch, which is a weekly community newspaper published by Beacon Media News.

Notable people 

 Donna Adamek, professional bowler, born in Duarte
 Andrew Cherng and Peggy Cherng, founders of Panda Express
 Hardiman Cureton, football player, born in Duarte
 Margaret Finlay, former mayor of Duarte
 Carlos Fisher, pitcher for the Cincinnati Reds
 Lois Gaston, first African-American mayor of Duarte
 Garrett K. Gomez, thoroughbred jockey
 Bill Melton, professional baseball player (1971 American League home run leader with 33)
 Glenn Miller, jazz musician, bandleader
 Sam Shepard, playwright, writer and actor (described Duarte as a "weird accumulation of things, a strange kind of melting pot – Spanish, Okie, Black, Midwestern elements all jumbled together. People on the move who couldn't move anymore, who wound up in trailer parks.")
 William A. Spinks (1865–1933), carom billiards player
 Cary-Hiroyuki Tagawa, actor

See also 

Ranchos of California
Spanish missions in California

References

External links 
 
 Duarte Chamber of Commerce
 Duarte Historical Society

 
1957 establishments in California
Cities in Los Angeles County, California
Communities in the San Gabriel Valley
Incorporated cities and towns in California
Populated places established in 1957